Jageshwar Yadav (born July 11, 1917) was an Indian politician and leader of Communist Party of India. He represented Banda Lok Sabha constituency from 1967 to 1971.

He was previously associated with the Indian National Congress and the Praja Socialist Party; took part in the 1942 movement and suffered rigorous imprisonment for two years with, five; took part in the food agitation launched by the P.S.P. in 1957 and jailed for 14 days; Gen. Secretary, Maval Congress Committee, Baberu, 1947–48; Member, D.C.C., 1947; Secretary, Junior High School, Patwan, Banda; Manager, Yadav Ashram, Akshabat, Chitrakoot, District Satna; Auditor, Shri Krishna Junior High School, Punahur, District Banda; Convener, Kisan Mazdoor Sammelan, District Banda.

References

Communist Party of India politicians from Uttar Pradesh
1917 births
Year of death missing
India MPs 1967–1970